Two main school systems have served the Kane County, Illinois core location of Aurora, Illinois since the 1860s, one on either side of the Fox River which physically divides the city. In addition, the far eastern portion of Aurora, within DuPage County, Illinois, has been served by Indian Prairie School District (IPSD)[] 204 since that district's formation in 1972. All three of these districts (Aurora Public Schools: West Side, Aurora Public Schools: East Side and IPSD) have their headquarters and administrative offices in Aurora city limits. As of 2005 there will be no less than forty public schools within Aurora city limits, serving residents of Aurora and neighboring communities.

Due to the sheer size of the city of Aurora, these are not the only three school systems serving residents - some students in the far north end of the city (north of I88 in Kane County) attend Batavia, Illinois public schools, some on the far southwest side attend the Kaneland Community Unit School District 302 (headquartered in Maple Park, Illinois), and some students in the far south end of the city (Kendall and Will County portions) attend Oswego, Illinois public schools.  The Wheatlands Elementary School in Kendall County, Illinois and the Homestead Elementary School, Wolf's Crossing Elementary School and Bednarcik Junior High School in Will County, Illinois of Oswego Community Unit School District 308, are located within Aurora's city limits. For this article, the districts with headquarters in Aurora are listed in alphabetical order.

Aurora is also home to the Illinois Mathematics and Science Academy (IMSA), a state-funded residential magnet school for grades 10 to 12. While IMSA operates under public funds (and uses the site originally designated West Aurora High School North Campus), it is managed wholly independently of the other public schools in the city of Aurora. Young residents meeting IMSA's requirements who live in Aurora, or any other Illinois community, may apply for admission to IMSA.

East Aurora public schools

Indian Prairie School District 204

West Aurora public schools

External links
Indian Prairie School District 204 Official Site
West Aurora District 129 Official Site
East Aurora District 131 Official Site

 
School districts in DuPage County, Illinois
School districts in Kane County, Illinois